Michael S. Breed (born May 14, 1962, in Greenwich, Connecticut) is a professional golf instructor and television host. In 2003, he was selected as a Top 100 Instructor in America by Golf Magazine,  in 2011, he was voted one of the Top 50 Instructors in America by Golf Digest (now 13th on this list, and #1 in the state of New York.), in 2012, Breed was chosen as the PGA's National Teacher of the Year. Prior to his time as a television host, Breed was the Head Golf Professional at Sunningdale Country Club for 12 years from 2001–2012, and the Head Golf Professional at Birchwood Country Club, as well as the Assistant Professional at Deepdale Golf Club and Augusta National Golf Club. He has served on different boards for the Metropolitan PGA for over 10 years and has represented the PGA of America at the National Golf Day in Washington D.C. since 2012. He is involved in charities such as The First Tee, Folds of Honor, Hope for the Warriors, Wounded Warriors Foundation and Salute Military Golf Association.

In 2008, Breed became the host for The Golf Fix on Golf Channel an instructional television show aimed at fixing the common errors in both course management and swings from amateurs. Originally debuting only in the United States, the Golf Fix is now in its seventh season, and can be seen in over 80 countries. Breed has also hosted Golf Channel's Big Break Academy, in which he helped eliminated contestants on the areas that were featured in the previous show. He has also been a part of the broadcast team for Golf Channel's coverage of the Nationwide Tour and PGA Tour serving as an on course commentator, since 1999, and serves as the analyst for PGA.com in its coverage of the PGA Championship, PGA Professional National Championship, and the Ryder Cup.

Breed's first book (co-authored with Greg Midland), Picture Perfect Golf Swing: The Complete Guide to Golf Swing Video Analysis, was released by Simon & Schuster/Atria Books on May 13, 2008.  Breed is the inventor of the putting and chipping brace for golfers.  He also hosts a radio show called Tee Time. Breed also contributed to writing No More Slice for Dummies. In September 2011, his second instructional book The 3-Degree Putting Solution was released by the Penguin Group. In 2014 he released the video series "Effect to Cause".

Other career highlights
2012 PGA National Teacher of the Year
2009 Metropolitan PGA Teacher of the Year
2006 and 2007 Metropolitan PGA Horton Smith Award Winner
Randolph-Macon College Hall of Fame Class of 2004
2000 Metropolitan PGA Teacher of the Year
Played in the 1994 Greater Hartford Open on the PGA Tour
Played a number of events on the Ben Hogan Tour in 1991
Graduated from Randolph-Macon College in Ashland, Virginia in 1985

Tour pros
Breed has worked with many tour pros over the years on the PGA Tour, Web.com Tour, LPGA Tour and mini tours. Players include: Shaun Micheel, James Vargas, John Kimbell, Meaghan Francella, Jay Williamson, Chris Smith, Kyle Reifers, Chris Parra, Scott Sterling, J.J. Henry, Joe Ogilvie, Bubba Dickerson, Doug Labelle, David Branshaw, Kyle Thompson, Jeff Gove, Tom Byrum, Ron Whittaker, Darron Stiles, Curt Byrum, and Kevin Johnson.

References

External links

American male golfers
Golfers from New York (state)
Golfers from Connecticut
People from Westchester County, New York
Sportspeople from Greenwich, Connecticut
People from West Nyack, New York
1962 births
Living people